Morecambe Football Club is an English football club based in Morecambe, Lancashire. It plays its football in League One, the third tier of English football, having been promoted in 2007 for the first time in their history to the Football League, and again in 2021.

History
Football in the town dates back to the turn of the 20th century; however, it was not until 7 May 1920 that Morecambe FC was formed after a meeting at the local West View Hotel. The club then took its place in the Lancashire Combination League for the 1920–21 season. At the end of the first season the club moved grounds to Roseberry Park. A few years later after the purchase of the ground by the then-President, Mr. J.B. Christie, the ground's name was changed to Christie Park, in his honour. Those early seasons proved difficult and it was not until 1924–25 that the club began to enjoy some success, claiming the league title for the first time; this was later followed by success in the Lancashire Junior Cup, beating old rivals Chorley after two replays, and in front of over 30,000 spectators.

Mr. Christie bequeathed the ground to the club in 1927 and also helped incorporate the club into a Limited Company with a then share capital of £1,000. The rest of the 1920s and the whole of the 1930s saw a constant struggle to keep football alive on the North West coast, with poor results on the field and little or no revenue off the field, a near certain recipe for disaster.

The post-war era saw an upturn in the Shrimps' fortunes with steady progress throughout the late 1940s and nearly all the 1950s. These years included an FA Cup third round appearance in 1961–62, a 1–0 defeat to Weymouth; a Lancashire Senior Cup Final victory in 1968, a 2–1 win over Burnley and an FA Trophy success at Wembley in 1974, a 2–1 win over Dartford in the final.

The next decade were as barren as any previous period in the club's history, with the Grim Reaper never far from the Christie Park door. Attendances fell from a creditable 2,000 plus to a miserable 200 minus, with a visible decline in the club fortunes during that period. However, in 1985–86, signs of improvement appeared: the club's league position improved and cup success over the next few years filled the club with optimism.

It took ten years of continual improvement both on and off the field to reach the club's ambition of promotion to the Football Conference after many further improvements, not only to the ground but also regarding the club's structure, giving the club the opportunity to confidently look forward as one of the more progressive Conference clubs.

Since elevation to the Conference in season 1995–96, the Shrimps achieved status as one of the leading teams in the league. In fact, only Woking had a longer unbroken membership of the league at this time. Runners-up spot was claimed on one occasion and the play-offs places were narrowly missed twice. Also during this time, the club also equalled its best appearance in the FA Cup in both 2000–01 and 2002–03. On both occasions the club faced Ipswich Town, losing 3–0 and 4–0 respectively. Morecambe also defeated a few league clubs in the FA Cup, including Cambridge United in 2000–01 and Chesterfield in 2002–03.

Morecambe were promoted to the Football League for the first time in their history after winning the Conference Playoff Final, beating Exeter City 2–1 at Wembley on 20 May 2007, in front of over 40,000 fans which followed their semi-final victory over York City.

On 17 July 2007, Morecambe announced plans to move to a new stadium in time for the start of the 2009–10 season. Work did not commence on the proposed site until spring 2009 with an anticipated completion date of summer 2010.

Morecambe played their first game in the Football League against Barnet at Christie Park in August 2007, in which they played out a 0–0 draw to secure their first ever Football League point.

2009–10 was Morecambe's last season at Christie Park. They finished the season in fourth place, qualifying for the playoffs, where they lost 7–2 on aggregate to Dagenham & Redbridge. On 10 August 2010, Morecambe played their first match at the Globe Arena against Championship side Coventry City in the League Cup First Round. Morecambe secured a 2–0 win, with Andy Fleming scoring the first two goals at the stadium. This earned Morecambe a Lancashire Derby in the second round against another Championship side, Burnley, where they lost 3–1.

Key

Key to league record
 Level = Level of the league in the current league system
 Pld = Games played
 W = Games won
 D = Games drawn
 L = Games lost
 GF = Goals for
 GA = Goals against
 GD = Goals difference
 Pts = Points
 Position = Position in the final league table
 Top scorer and number of goals scored shown in bold when he was also top scorer for the division.

Key to cup records
 Res = Final reached round
 Rec = Final club record in the form of wins-draws-losses
 PR = Preliminary round
 QR1 (2, etc.) = Qualifying Cup rounds
 G = Group stage
 R1 (2, etc.) = Proper Cup rounds
 QF = Quarter-finalists
 SF = Semi-finalists
 F = Finalists
 A (QF, SF, F) = Area quarter-, semi-, finalists
 W = Winners

Seasons

References

Seasons
 
Morecambe